Mildred Plew Meigs (born Mildred Plew) was an American poet. Born to  Chicago financier James E. Plew and Nettie Plew (née Raymond), Mildred spent her adult life in Valparaiso, Florida. She is most famous for her poem "The Pirate Don Durk of Dowdee", which she published in Child Life Magazine in a 1923 issue.

Her first published book, The Road To Raffydiddle, is dated 1913, and features illustrations by Frank Aloise.

She contributed dozens of poems to Child Life Magazine, Harper's, Motion Picture, Poetry, and other lifestyle magazines, and is credited as the author of six children's books.

Mildred Plew Meigs died on February 22, 1944, in her home in Valparaiso, Florida.

 Notable works 
Merryman, Mildred Plew, and Ve Elizabeth Cadie. Bonbon and Bonbonette. Chicago: Rand McNally & Co., 1924. 
Merryman, Mildred Plew, and Mary Phipps. Quack Said Jerusha!. New York: Sears Pub. Co. Copyright 1930. 
Merryman, Mildred Plew. Riddle Book, etc.'' Akron, New York: Saffield Publishing Co, 1936. 
 The Pirate Don Durk of Dowdee
 Moon Song

Personal life 
Mildred Plew was raised in Chicago. In 1916, she married Carl Plummer Merryman.

They moved in 1923 with her father and family to Valparaiso, Florida. During these years she was prolifically published, both in magazines and with children's books, with illustrations provided by Ve Elizabeth Cadie.

Mildred Plew divorced Carl Merryman in 1935.

In the 1940 census, her spouse is listed as Clifford Meigs.

Legacy 
Plew's works have been featured in elementary school choral readings and educational literature.

References 

1892 births
1944 deaths
American women poets
Writers from Chicago
People from Valparaiso, Florida
Poets from Florida
Poets from Illinois
20th-century American poets
20th-century American women writers